Joseph Robert "Bob" Birrell (born 6 March 1938) is a retired British hurdler and coach.

Athletics career
He competed in the men's 110 metres hurdles at the 1960 Summer Olympics. 

At the 1958 British Empire and Commonwealth Games, Birrell competed in the 120 yard hurdles and reached the semi-finals. During the 1962 British Empire and Commonwealth Games, Birrell was sixth place at  the 120 yard hurdles event. He is the younger brother of Joe Birrell.

Coaching and personal life
As well as having a career as a PE and chemistry teacher from 1962, Birrell later became the UK Junior track and field team manager. In the latter role, he coached Steve Smith, Curtis Robb, and Diane Allahgreen.

References

1938 births
Living people
Athletes (track and field) at the 1960 Summer Olympics
British male hurdlers
Olympic athletes of Great Britain
Athletes (track and field) at the 1958 British Empire and Commonwealth Games
Athletes (track and field) at the 1962 British Empire and Commonwealth Games
Commonwealth Games competitors for England
Place of birth missing (living people)